Nittambuwa is a semi urban town, situated in Gampaha District, Sri Lanka. The town is situated on the Colombo-Kandy highway. It is connected also to Negombo with the highway via Veyangoda-Minuwangoda. It was the home town of the world's first female prime minister Sirimawo Bandaranayake.

List of politicians from Nittambuwa 
 Prime minister S. W. R. D. Bandaranaike
 Prime minister Sirimawo Bandaranayake
 President Chandrika Kumaratunga 
 Speaker Anura Bandaranaike

List of schools of Nittambuwa 

 Sri Sanghabodhi Central College
 Bauddha Maha Vidyalaya
 Roman Catholic Kanishta Vidyalaya
 Sariputta National College Of Education
 Ranpokunagama Maha Vidyalaya

Populated places in Western Province, Sri Lanka